Mohammed Taufiq bin Johari (Jawi: محمد توفيق بن جوهري; born 6 March 1996) is a Malaysian politician who has served as the Member of Parliament (MP) for Sungai Petani since November 2022. He is a member of the People's Justice Party (PKR), a component party of the Pakatan Harapan (PH) coalition. He is the sole Kedah PH MP and son of Speaker of the Dewan Rakyat and former Sungai Petani MP Johari Abdul. He is also presently the youngest MP at the age of 27.

Early life and education
Mohammed Taufiq bin Johari was born on 6 March 1996 in Kuala Lumpur, Malaysia. His father was Johari bin Abdul who is the current Speaker of the Dewan Rakyat since 2022 and a former Member of Parliament (MP) of Sungai Petani since 2008 until 2022. He has seven siblings.

He attended school at Gombak High School, Selangor before further his studies at Bandung Islamic University in Doctor of Medicine (MD).

Political career
He serves as the Ketua Pemuda Pakatan Harapan Kedah, Ketua Angkatan Muda Keadilan Kedah and Ketua Angkatan Muda Keadilan Sungai Petani. Taufiq won in the last 2022 Malaysian general election.

Election results

References

See also 
 Members of the Dewan Rakyat, 15th Malaysian Parliament

Living people
Members of the 15th Malaysian Parliament
21st-century Malaysian politicians
People's Justice Party (Malaysia) politicians
1996 births